This is a list of the deadliest tropical cyclones, including all known storms that caused at least 1,000 direct deaths. There were at least 74 tropical cyclones in the 20th century with a death toll of 1,000 or more, including the deadliest tropical cyclone in recorded history. In October 1970, the Bhola cyclone struck what is now Bangladesh and killed at least 300,000 people. There have been 13 tropical cyclones in the 21st century so far with a death toll of at least 1,000, of which the deadliest was Cyclone Nargis, with at least 138,373 deaths when it struck Myanmar. In recent years, the deadliest Atlantic hurricane was Hurricane Mitch of 1998, with at least 11,374 deaths attributed to it, while the deadliest Atlantic hurricane was the Great Hurricane of 1780, which resulted in at least 22,000 fatalities. The most recent tropical cyclone with at least 1,000 fatalities was Cyclone Idai in 2019, which killed 1,593 people.

19th century and earlier

20th century

21st century

See also

 List of tropical cyclones
 List of costliest Atlantic hurricanes
 List of Atlantic hurricane records
 List of retired Atlantic hurricane names
 List of Pacific hurricanes

Notes

References

External links
United States National Hurricane Center

Deadliest
Atlantic hurricane